Students for Saving Social Security, known as S4, was a 501(c)(3) non-profit activist organization based in Washington, D.C., run by students for students pushing for Social Security reform. S4 was founded in March 2005 and proposed changing Social Security laws to permit personal savings accounts. The organization had a network of 300+ college chapters with more than 11,000 members by 2008.

S4 believed Social Security was an issue that should be addressed by the Congress. Co-founders Jonathan Swanson and Patrick Wetherille proclaimed:

Operations

Executive Director Jo Jensen, Strategic Communications Director Neha Shah and Development Director Karen Lee were both graduates of Mount Holyoke College. National Director Ryan Lynch attended Emory University and studied at Georgetown University's graduate school.

Three directors of S4, Marco Zappacosta, Jonathan Swanson, Jeremy Tunnell went on to found the online marketplace and unicorn company Thumbtack.

External links
 www.SecureOurFuture.org
 S4 featured in the Wall Street Journal (January 2008)

References

Student societies in the United States